Malachi Mitchell-Thomas (23 September 1995 – 14 May 2016) was a motorcycle racer from Blackrod, Greater Manchester.

Career 
He started pure road racing back in 2014 at the Isle of Man, in an event in the old capital of the Island called Castletown. The Southern 100 is the name of the event, where Malachi achieved his first of many podiums.    
He won a Senior Manx Grand Prix in 2015, aged just 19, setting a new track record in the process. In 2016, Mitchell-Thomas was signed by Cookstown Burrows Engineering Racing to race in the upcoming motorcycling season.

Death
Mitchell-Thomas died of injuries received at the North West 200 on 14 May 2016. The 20-year-old crashed his Kawasaki on the approach to Black Hill. The race was immediately red flagged and Malachi was treated by medical staff from the MCUI Medical team but succumbed to his injuries at the scene. No other riders were involved in the incident. Racing was subsequently abandoned. Around 200 motorcycles and cars were part of an escort for Malachi's funeral. Malachi's ashes were scattered by his father Kevin, at the 2016 Isle of Man TT Racing festival.

References

English motorcycle racers
1995 births
2016 deaths
Motorcycle racers who died while racing

2. http://www.irishnews.com/news/northernirelandnews/2016/05/30/news/heart-breaking-last-words-of-north-west-crash-victim-malachi-mitchell-thomas-538967/